Figge may refer to:

 Figge Art Museum in Davenport, Iowa
 Figge Boström a Swedish musician
 Erika Figge, an American water polo player
 Alex Figge, an American race car driver
 Jennifer Figge, female swimmer, allegedly the first woman to swim the Atlantic Ocean